Sharif Bey (born 1974, Pittsburgh, Pennsylvania, U.S.) is an African American artist, ceramicist and professor. He produces both functional pottery  and ceramic and mixed- media sculpture, using a variety of forms and textures. His body of work reflects his interest in the visual heritage of Africa and Oceania, as well as contemporary African American culture. With  his colorful large-scale bead sculptures, Bey explores the cultural and political significance of ornamentation and adornment.

Education 
As a high school student, Bey completed a ceramics apprenticeship at the Manchester Craftsmen's Guild. The Manchester Craftsmen's Guild played a formative role for Bey throughout his teens, giving him a foundation of skills, extensive ceramics-world connections, and exposure to various visiting masters – including Jun Kaneko, Karen Karnes, Judy Moonelis, Paul Soldner, and Akio Takamori. Shortly after the fall of the Soviet Union, Bey studied sculpture at The Academy of Fine Arts and Design, Bratislava (Slovak Republic). Later, he earned his BFA in ceramics from Slippery Rock University, his MFA in studio art from the University of North Carolina at Greensboro, and PhD in art education from Pennsylvania State University.

Career 
Bey's teaching experience includes appointments at: Winston Salem State University, Virginia Commonwealth University, and Syracuse University. He has held artist residencies at the McColl Center for Art + Innovation, John Michael Kohler Arts Center, Pittsburgh Glass Center, and Archie Bray Foundation for the Ceramic Arts.

Art career 
Since being featured at the Renwick Gallery Smithsonian American Art Museum in 2018, The Carnegie Museum of Art, Everson Museum of Art and the Gardiner Museum of Ceramic Art in Toronto have all held solo exhibitions of Bey's Work. His ceramic, glass and mixed-media sculptures can be found in public collections  including: Smithsonian American Art Museum's Renwick Gallery, Museum of Fine Arts Houston, Carnegie Museum of Art, Everson Museum of Art, Dallas Museum of Art, Mint Museum, Columbus Museum of Art, Hickory Museum of Art, Gardiner Museum, John Michael Kohler Arts Center, and the United States Embassies in Indonesia, Sudan, and Uganda.

His work has been exhibited at:

  Sharif Bey: Colonial Ruptures (2022) Gardiner Museum
  Sharif Bey: Facets (2022) Everson Museum of Art<
  Sharif Bey: Excavations (2021–2022) Carnegie Museums of Pittsburgh 
 Objects USA 2020 (2020) R & Company 
 Adorned (2020) McColl Center for Art and Innovation
  Pittsburgh Anthology (2019–2020) Carnegie Museums of Pittsburgh 
 Disrupting Craft: Renwick Invitational (2018–2019) at the Smithsonian American Art Museum's Renwick Gallery
 Sharif Bey: Dialogues in Clay and Glass (2018) at the Pittsburgh Glass Center

References 

1974 births
Living people
American ceramists
Artists from Pittsburgh
African-American artists
21st-century African-American people
20th-century African-American people